David "Elsewhere" Bernal (born August 2, 1979) is an illusionary dancer from Santa Ana, California. His mother is Peruvian, and his father is from New Mexico. He became known through a viral video clip —often titled Kolla2001— of his participation in the 2001 edition of the Korean American talent show Kollaboration, dancing to the Kraftwerk song "Expo 2000". He has been involved as a dancer in a number of projects since, including videos, adverts, and the Tim Burton film Alice in Wonderland. He has also worked with artists such as Michael Jackson.

Viral video
Bernal first became known through a video of him battle dancing against Mike Song of the Kinjaz at Kollaboration, an Asian-American talent show, in 2001 that went viral. The clip showcased Bernal's characteristic take on the contemporary dance styles of popping and abstract waving. Performances of these dances were rare at the time, and the clip became very popular when it circulated on the internet — so popular that in November 2006, The Viral Factory, a viral marketing company, collated page-impression figures from websites such as YouTube and Google Videos. They determined that, as of November 2006, this video had been viewed over 200 million times, making it the 8th most viewed video.

Bernal is not double jointed, a popular misconception. He says:
"I'm not double-jointed at all. The only place where I am double-jointed in my thumbs, which doesn't even matter. I would say I'm probably a little more flexible than most people in certain areas, mainly my shoulders and my ankles, but I wasn't born that way. Those areas became flexible because of years of practicing."

Career
Following his exposure in the viral video, Bernal was hired to participate in a number of advertisements, such as Heineken (dancing to "Cobrastyle" by the Teddybears), Volkswagen, Apple iPod, 7-Eleven Slurpee, Pepsi, Puma, and Doritos. He also made a cameo appearance in the 2004 film You Got Served and in TV performances including The Tonight Show with Jay Leno.

Computer graphics technology were used in several of the commercials Bernal took part in, superimposing others' faces (old, young, male, female) onto his body so that they appeared to dance like him. In one of his most popular ads, a commercial for the Volkswagen Golf GTI created in January 2005, Gene Kelly's head was superimposed onto Bernal's body in a re-enactment of "Singin' in the Rain" remixed by Manchester group Mint Royale.

Bernal also filmed and edited a large amount of the documentary video titled Detours. The video featured experimental dance styles focused primarily on four dancers, Midus, Kujo, Rawbzilla, and Elsewhere. While focusing much of the video on the four primary dancers, dozens of others were also featured in the video. The project has since ended and videos can be bought through various websites.

In September 2006, he was featured in the music video for "Sister Twisted", a song by Mexican band Kinky, in which he plays a Mexican cowboy who does a twisted locking and popping performance while a war against aliens occurs in the background.

On August 8, 2007, Bernal and his dancing was featured in a segment of the inaugural episode of ABC's video-clip program, i-Caught.

Bernal was collaborating with Michael Jackson for Jackson's This Is It residency at London's O2 Arena prior to Jackson's death.

Bernal was the dance double for the Mad Hatter in Tim Burton's Alice in Wonderland (2010) during the "Futterwacken" dance.

He worked with artist Nicholas Galanin to dance in a video titled "Tsu Heidel Shugaxtutaan" or "We will again open this container of wisdom that has been left in our care".  He has also collaborated with other dancers such as Mori Koichiro (森弘一郎).

References

External links
David Bernal on Myspace
David elsewhere Official channel on YouTube
  
 
 

American male dancers
American Internet celebrities
People from Santa Ana, California
American people of Peruvian descent
Viral videos
Living people
1979 births